Bank of Montreal National Historic Site is an historic former bank branch in Montreal.  Built in 1894 in sandstone on the corners of rue Notre Dame Ouest and rue des Seigneurs, this building was named a National Historic Site of Canada in 1990 because:

The building now has a café on the ground floor.

References

Bank of Montreal
National Historic Sites in Quebec
Historic bank buildings in Canada
Commercial buildings in Montreal
Commercial buildings completed in 1894
Sandstone buildings in Canada
Queen Anne architecture in Canada
Le Sud-Ouest
Buildings and structures on the National Historic Sites of Canada register